Erica Udén Johansson (born 20 July 1989) is a Swedish retired ice hockey player, currently serving as conditioning coach of AIK Hockey Dam in the Swedish Women's Hockey League (SDHL). An eleven-season member of the Swedish national team, she participated in the women's ice hockey tournaments at the Winter Olympics in 2010, 2014, and 2018. Udén Johansson played college ice hockey in the NCAA with the Quinnipiac Bobcats women's ice hockey program.

Playing career

Sweden
Udén Johansson was a member of the IF Sundsvall Hockey Wildcats of the Swedish women’s Division 1 from 2005 to 2008. During 2007 to 2009, Udén Johansson played with Modo Hockey Dam in the Riksserien (renamed SDHL in 2016). She signed with Segeltorps IF for the 2009–10 Riksserien season.

NCAA
Udén Johansson joined the Quinnipiac Bobcats women’s ice hockey program in 2010–11. Against the Sacred Heart Pioneers on 10 October 2010, Udén Johansson scored a hat trick.

Awards and honors
2008 and 2009 Swedish champion bronze medalist with Modo
2010 Swedish champion gold medalist with Segeltorps IF
MLX Skates Player of the Week (week of 12 October 2010)
MLX Skates Rookie of the Week (week of 12 October 2010)

References

External links
 
 

1989 births
Living people
AIK Hockey Dam players
Brynäs IF Dam players
Ice hockey players at the 2010 Winter Olympics
Ice hockey players at the 2014 Winter Olympics
Ice hockey players at the 2018 Winter Olympics
Modo Hockey Dam players
Olympic ice hockey players of Sweden
People from Sundsvall Municipality
Quinnipiac Bobcats women's ice hockey players
Sportspeople from Västernorrland County
Swedish expatriate ice hockey players in the United States
Swedish Women's Hockey League coaches
Swedish women's ice hockey forwards